Associazione Sportiva Waterpolis Pescara was an Italian water polo club based in Pescara, Abruzzo.

History 
As any top Italian water polo club, Pescara has written in golden letters her own great stories both in the domestic and even more in the competitive European competitions. Crowning achievement of the club so far consists the winning of 1988 LEN Champions League over against the mighty West German team of the 80's, Spandau 04, closely followed by the multiple wins of  Italian Cups and LEN Cup Winners' Cups in the second period of its golden age in the middle '90s. The 1996 LEN Trophy was Pescara's last major European win before the long-awaited climbing to the top of the Italian league for two consecutive years in 1997 and 1998. Throughout, the aforementioned period is characterized by Pescara's continuous unsuccessful attempt to throw off Savona and mostly Posillipo from the throne of Serie A1 and LEN Champions League. In 1998 Pescara tried to double its European leagues (ten years after the first time) but defeated 8-6 in the final by  its great rival and last European Champion, Posillipo. Also this was a unique chance to make the triple crown achievement.

The two LEN Super Cups in '88 and '93 puts the club in the small but yet honorary list of European water polo clubs that have emerged at least once in their history winners of all LEN competitions.

In the 2000s the club has experienced a slow decline in sports and corporate, losing participation in the European Cup and then to the top flight. At the beginning of the 2009-10 season AS Waterpolis Pescara announced its failure and the withdrawal from all domestic and international leagues.

In water polo team of Pescara have played Olympic and world champions, and, in general, the great names of Italian and foreign water polo as the brothers Roberto and Alessandro Calcaterra, Marco D'Altrui, Amedeo Pomilio, Francesco Attolico and Spaniard Manuel Estiarte.

Honours

European competitions 
 LEN Champions League
 Winners (1): 1987-88
 Runners-up (1): 1997-98
LEN Cup Winners' Cup
 Winners (3): 1989-90, 1992–93, 1993–94
 Runners-up (1): 1994-95
 LEN Trophy
 Winners (1): 1995-96
 LEN Super Cup
 Winners (2): 1988, 1993
 Runners-up (2): 1990, 1994

Domestic competitions 
 Italian League
 Winners (3): 1986-87, 1996–97, 1997–98
 Coppa Italia
 Winners (5): 1984-85, 1985–86, 1988–89, 1991–92, 1997–98

References

Water polo clubs in Italy
Sport in Pescara